Pierre Nguyen may refer to:

Pierre Nguyễn Văn Nhơn (born 1938), Vietnamese cardinal
Pierre Nguyễn Văn Khảm (born 1952), Vietnamese bishop

See also
Peter Nguyen (disambiguation)